Psychological Trauma: Theory, Research, Practice, and Policy is a peer-reviewed academic journal published by the American Psychological Association on behalf of Division 56. It was established in 2009 and covers research on the psychological effects of trauma. The incoming editor-in-chief is Kathleen Kendall-Tackett of Texas Tech University School of Medicine.

Abstracting and indexing 
The journal is abstracted and indexed by the Social Sciences Citation Index. According to the Journal Citation Reports, the journal has a 2020 impact factor of 3.226.

References

External links 
 

American Psychological Association academic journals
English-language journals